Middle Arm is a village in the Canadian province of Newfoundland and Labrador. It is located on the northern shore of an inlet of Notre Dame Bay in the north-central part of Newfoundland.

The town had a population of 443 in the Canada 2021 Census.

Demographics 

See also
 Baie Verte Peninsula
 List of cities and towns in Newfoundland and Labrador

References

Towns in Newfoundland and Labrador